Working Time Directive 2003/88/EC is a European Union law Directive and a key part of European labour law. It gives EU workers the right to:
at least 28 days (four weeks) in paid holidays each year, 
rest breaks of 20 minutes in a 6 hour period, 
daily rest of at least 11 hours in any 24 hours; 
restricts excessive night work; 
at least 24 hours rest in a 7 day period; 
a right to work no more than 48 hours per week, unless the member state enables individual opt-outs. 

It was issued as an update on earlier versions from 22 June 2000 and 23 November 1993. Since excessive working time is cited as a major cause of stress, depression, and illness, the purpose of the directive is to protect people's health and safety. A landmark study conducted by the World Health Organization and the International Labour Organization found that exposure to long working hours is common globally at 8.9%, and according to these United Nations estimates the occupational risk factor with the largest attributable burden of disease, i.e. an estimated 745,000 fatalities from ischemic heart disease and stroke events alone in 2016. This evidence has given renewed impetus for maximum limits on working time to protect human life and health.

Background
Like all European Union directives, this is an instrument which requires member states to enact its provisions in national legislation. The directive applies to all member states. It is possible to opt out of the 48-hour working week, but not the other requirements.

After the 1993 Council Negotiations, when the 1993 version of the Directive was agreed to after an 11–1 vote, UK Employment Secretary David Hunt said, "It is a flagrant abuse of Community rules. It has been brought forward as such simply to allow majority voting – a ploy to smuggle through part of the Social Chapter by the back door. The UK strongly opposes any attempt to tell people that they can no longer work the hours they want."

Contents

Aims and definitions
 Part 1 – purpose as health and safety
 Part 2 – definitions; night time is between midnight and 5 am and not less than seven hours
 Part 14 – more specific EU provisions take precedence
 Part 15 – minimum standards directive
 Part 16 – maximum reference period is fourteen days for article 5; four months for article 6; and determined by collective agreement for article 8;
 Part 23 – the directive cannot be a reason to reduce protection
 Part 24 – reporting to the EU Commission on the implementation of the WTD
 Parts 25–26 – review of derogations for fishing boats and passenger carriers

Breaks
 Article 3 – there must be a daily rest of eleven consecutive hours per 24-hour period.
 Article 4 – a rest period for every six hours, set by legislation or collective agreement.
 Article 5 – weekly rest of 24 hours uninterrupted, on top of the daily rest in article 3, but derogation is justifiable for technical, organizational, or work reasons.

Working week
 Article 6
 member states must ensure weekly working time is limited by law, or collective agreement
 average working time should not exceed 48 hours for each 7-day period.
 Article 17 – derogations allowed under arts 3–6, 8 and 16 for (1) "managing executives or other persons with autonomous decision making powers", family workers and religious leaders (2) ... (5) doctors' provisions.
 Article 18 – derogations by collective agreement.
 Article 19 – limit to derogation for the reference period.
 Article 20 – mobile and offshore workers.
 Article 21 – workers on fishing vessels.
 Article 22 – "miscellaneous"
 individual opt out for article 6 where:
 the worker agrees
 no detriment for not agreeing
 records kept up to date
 authorities kept informed
 information given
 three-week transitional provision
 inform EU Commission.

Paid holidays
 Article 7 – annual leave of at least four weeks (i.e., 20 days on a full-time basis). The term "week" is defined by article 5, which refers to "weekly" as meaning a "seven-day period". If an employee's job is terminated, he or she is entitled to payment in lieu of holidays that were not taken.

Night work
 Article 8
 eight hours night work in any 24-hour period on average
 eight hours where hazardous or strenuous work.
 Article 9 – free health assessments for night workers.
 Article 10 – night workers who risk health can be given guarantees.
 Article 11 – night workers to be notified to competent authorities "if they so request".
 Article 12 – night and shift workers should have health protection.
 Article 13 – "an employer who intends to organize work according to a certain pattern takes account of the general principle of adapting work to the worker, with a view, in particular, to alleviating monotonous work and work at a predetermined work-rate".

Case law

The Working Time Directive has also been clarified and interpreted through a number of rulings in the European Court of Justice. The most notable of these have been the "SIMAP" and "Jaeger" judgments (Sindicato de Médicos de Asistencia Pública v Conselleria de Sanidad y Consumo de la Generalidad Valenciana, 2000 and Landeshauptstadt Kiel v Jaeger, 2003).

The SIMAP judgment defined all times when the worker was required to be present on site as actual working hours, for the purposes of work and rest calculations. The Jaeger judgment confirmed that this was the case even if workers could sleep when their services were not required.

See also
EU labour law
UK labour law
German labour law
Labour law
Working Time Regulations 1998 (SI 1998/1833)

Notes

External links
Documents from the European Council, Commission, and Parliament
Directive 2003/88/EC of the European Parliament and of the Council of 4 November 2003 concerning certain aspects of the organisation of working time
Council Directive 93/104/EC of 23 November 1993 concerning certain aspects of the organization of working time – repealed by Directive 2003/88/EC, as follows
Prelex: adoption procedure of Directive 2003/88/EC
National implementing measures of Directive 2003/88/EC
Report from the Commission on the operation of the provisions of Directive 2003/88/EC
Commission Opinion — Extension of transitional arrangements for the working time of doctors in training in the United Kingdom
Commission Opinion — Extension of transitional arrangements for the working time of doctors in training in Hungary
Prelex: Adoption procedure file for the Commission's proposal for revision of Working Time Directive, COM(2004) 607. Legal Observatory: The European Parliament's procedure file for the proposal.

Judgments from the European Court of Justice
Judgment of the Court of 12 November 1996. United Kingdom of Great Britain and Northern Ireland v Council of the European Union. Council Directive 93/104/EC concerning certain aspects of the organization of working time – Action for annulment. Case C-84/94.
Judgment of the Court of 3 October 2000. Sindicato de Médicos de Asistencia Pública (SiMAP) v. Conselleria de Sanidad y Consumo de la Generalidad Valenciana
Judgment of the Court of 9 September 2003. Landeshauptstadt Kiel v Norbert Jaeger

Non-governmental organisation documents
 European Public Health Alliance: "Impact on health workforce of the working time directive"

With regard to the United Kingdom
Department of Trade and Industry: Working Time Regulations
Health & Safety Executive: The Working Time Regulations
Department of Health: European Working Time Directive
BBC News (2002-04-29): Q&A: Working time directive

1993 in law
1993 in the European Union
European Union directives
European Union employment directives
Working time